One Enterprise Center is a  skyscraper in Jacksonville, Florida. Located in the Northbank area of Downtown, tenants include Rayonier and CBRE Group. The building also shares a lobby with an adjacent Omni Hotel. The 21-floor structure was designed by Clark Tribble Harris & Li Architects and completed in 1986.

Gallery

See also

 Architecture of Jacksonville
 Downtown Jacksonville
 List of tallest buildings in Jacksonville
 List of tallest buildings in Florida

References

Skyscraper office buildings in Jacksonville, Florida
Postmodern architecture in Florida
Downtown Jacksonville
Northbank, Jacksonville

Office buildings completed in 1986
1986 establishments in Florida